The ERA HSS, or ERA SS, is a single-seater track car produced by Tiger Racing. Tiger Racing say that the styling of the ERA HSS is influenced by early Lotus and BRM vehicles.

References 

Racing cars
ERA vehicles